The Hyde Park Estate is a residential district in the Paddington area of London. It is an affluent area, characterised by a layout of squares and crescents, and is home to several embassies, prestigious businesses and celebrities.

Location
The Estate covers a triangular area, centred on Hyde Park Square, roughly located south-east of Sussex Gardens, west of the Edgware Road and north of Bayswater Road, between Lancaster Gate and Marble Arch.

It includes Connaught Square and Connaught Village, Water Gardens, Norfolk Crescent and the church of St John's, Hyde Park.

History
The Hyde Park Estate was developed in the nineteenth century on land owned by the Bishop of London and was originally known as the Paddington Estate.  Ownership then passed to the Church Commissioners who remain the primary freeholders of the estate.

After World War II, following extensive wartime bomb damage, the Church Commissioners rebuilt parts of the estate in partnership with the building firm Wates, introducing high density blocks of flats with underground car parking among the Victorian villas.

In September 2014, residents of 1 Hyde Park Street chose to take ownership of the Grade II listed building on the corner of Bayswater Road. A major refurbishment programme was then undertaken to address alleged historical underinvestment.

Distinguished residents
Past residents include:
 Hertha Ayrton, Physicist: Norfolk Square   
 Michael Balfe, Composer: Seymour Street   
 Tony Blair, Connaught Square
 Lady Violet Bonham-Carter, Politician & Writer: 43 Gloucester Square   
 Sir Charles Vyner Brooke, Last Rajah of Sarawak: 13 Albion Street  
 Michael Caine: Albion Close 
 Lord Randolph Churchill, Statesman: 2 Connaught Place   
 Olive Schreiner, Author: 16 Portsea Place   
 Robert Stephenson, Engineer: 33 Gloucester Square   
 Marie Taglioni, Ballerina: 14 Connaught Square   
 William Makepeace Thackeray, Author: 18 Albion Street 
Quentin Willson, Motoring journalist (Top Gear): Hyde Park Gardens Mews

References

Paddington
Housing estates in London